Saint-Rémy-au-Bois is a commune in the Pas-de-Calais department in the Hauts-de-France region of France.

Geography
Saint-Rémy-au-Bois is located 10 miles (16 km) southeast of Montreuil-sur-Mer on the D129 road.

Population

Places of interest
 The church of St. Rémy, dating from the eighteenth century
 A sixteenth-century bridge

See also
Communes of the Pas-de-Calais department

References

Saintremyaubois